Blekitni Kielce is a defunct Polish sports club, established in 1945 in Kielce. In 1949, it became supported by Kielce's office of communist police (milicja), its official name was changed into Guards Sports Club Blekitni Kielce and hues were red-white-blue, like in other sports clubs affiliated with milicja. Enjoying support of both milicja and Urząd Bezpieczeństwa, Blekitni became the major sports organization in the area of Kielce, however, it never managed to win promotion to the Polish First Division. Blekitni's football team played last games in the Third League in the 1998–99 season, then it was merged with local rival, Korona Kielce.

Association football clubs established in 1945
1945 establishments in Poland
Association football clubs disestablished in 1998
1998 disestablishments in Poland
Defunct football clubs in Poland
Sport in Kielce
Football clubs in Świętokrzyskie Voivodeship
Police association football clubs in Poland
Police sports clubs